Oban railway station is a railway station serving Oban in Scotland. It is the terminus of one branch of the highly scenic West Highland Line, sited  from Callander, via Glen Ogle. It was originally the terminus of the Callander and Oban Railway. All services are operated by ScotRail, who also manage the station.

Oban station provides interchange with the adjacent ferry terminal, offering connections to a number of destinations in the Inner and Outer Hebrides via ferry services operated by Caledonian MacBrayne (CalMac). Oban is CalMac's busiest ferry terminal.

History 

Oban station opened on 30 June 1880 as the terminus of the Callander and Oban Railway, which joined the present railway at Crianlarich, and which was absorbed into the LMS Railway in 1922. The route from Dunblane and Callander to Crianlarich closed in 1965, as well as the Ballachulish line. Formerly, a branch to Ballachulish railway station diverged just east of Connel Ferry railway station. A triangular junction was planned at Connel, but never completed.

Facilities 
The station is well-equipped with a ticket office, toilets, a help point, a car park, bike racks and a pay phone. All of the station has step-free access.

Passenger volume 

The statistics cover twelve month periods that start in April

Services 
On Monday to Fridays, there are six trains per day to Glasgow Queen Street, plus an additional afternoon service that runs only as far as Dalmally. On Saturdays, the service is very similar to that on weekdays, with the exception of the Dalmally train, which does not run. On Sundays there are three trains per day to Glasgow Queen Street all year round, plus a single Edinburgh return service on some weeks in the summer.

Oban Ferry Terminal 

Oban station is located next to Oban ferry terminal. Caledonian MacBrayne ferries sail daily from here to the islands of Lismore, Colonsay, Coll, Tiree, to Craignure on Mull, to Castlebay on Barra and to Lochboisdale (winter only) on South Uist. Ferries also operate to Mallaig. The times of connecting trains to/from Glasgow Queen Street are included on CalMac timetables.

References

Bibliography

External Links 

 Video footage of the station on YouTube

Railway stations in Argyll and Bute
Former Caledonian Railway stations
Railway stations in Great Britain opened in 1880
Railway stations served by ScotRail
Railway stations serving harbours and ports in the United Kingdom
Oban